The castle of Peñaranda de Duero, located in Peñaranda de Duero, Spain, is a well preserved Gothic castle in Burgos province. The castle originally dates from the 10th century but reforms by Counts of Miranda del Castañar in the 15th century changed much of the building. Today the castle stands at the start of a defensive wall that formerly surrounded the town, of which only the crenellated arch of "Las Monjas" still stands.

The castle was an important point on the fortified line which existed between the medieval Christian Kingdom of Castile and the Moor state of Al Andalus during the 10th century. The castle is a narrow walled precinct, with a four story keep rising from the center. The keep features a rooftop terrace, battlements, a gallery of machiolations, and three additional square towers, two of which flank the ogival arch that marks the entrance. The walls are solid stone ashlar stone, although much of the keep features decorative wooden beams.

Today, the Castle of Peñaranda de Duero serves as one of the many historical monuments and tourist attractions in the area. Tourists are charged a small admission fee between 1 and 2 euros for entry.

References

Sources
 Castillos de España (volumen II). VV.AA.. Editorial Everest, S.A.. León, 1997. (Pgs. 946-950).

External links 
 Castle of Peñaranda de Duero Peñarandadeduero.es 
 El Castillo de Peñaranda de Duero 

Penaranda de Duero